Major Arthur John Newman Tremearne (1877 – 25 September 1915) was a British barrister, major ("D" Company. 1st/22nd Battalion London Regiment attached to the 8th Battalion Seaforth Highlanders), anthropologist and ethnographer.

Life
Tremearne was born in Melbourne in 1877, son of Ada Tremearne, of Melbourne, Australia, and John Tremearne MRCS.  He was educated at Christ's College, Cambridge.

He was a lieutenant in the Second Boer War, but was invalided to England on 1 June 1900.  He was struck off field strength on joining the Ashanti Field Force.
He married Mary Louisa Tremearne, from Blackheath, London, in 1905.
He was a masonic deacon in the 	Royal Colonial Institute No. 3556 E.C. lodge.

He died at the Battle of Loos.  He left an estate of £4638 5/6.  There is a memorial;.

Head measuring device

In 1913 Tremearne developed a head-measuring device, which was modified with suggestions from Karl Pearson.

Publications
 The tailed head-hunters of Nigeria: an account of an official's seven years experiences in the Northern Nigerian Pagan Belt; and a description of the manners, habits, and customs of the native tribes. London (1912)
 Hausa superstitions and customs: an introduction to the Folk-Lore and the Folk. London (1913). Als PDF (62 MB)
 Some Austral-African notes and anecdotes. John Bale Sons & Danielsson, London (1913)
 The Ban of the Bori. Demons and demon-dancing in West and North-Africa. London (1914)
 Chapter in Georg Buschan's Die Sitten der Völker. Bd. 2, Union Deutsche Verlagsges., Stuttgart um 1920

References

1877 births
1915 deaths
Members of Gray's Inn
London Regiment officers
English Freemasons
Alumni of Christ's College, Cambridge
British military personnel killed in World War I
British ethnographers
English anthropologists
British military personnel of the Fourth Anglo-Ashanti War
British Army personnel of the Second Boer War
British Army personnel of World War I
British folklorists
Military personnel from Melbourne